Muldrow Glacier, also known as McKinley Glacier, is a large glacier in Denali National Park and Preserve in the U.S. state of Alaska. Native names for the glacier include, Henteel No' Loo' and Henteel No' Loot. 

The glacier originates from the Great Icefall of Harper Glacier on the eastern side of Denali. The glacier moves generally eastward, receiving Traleika Glacier and Brooks Glacier as tributaries, then turning northward to emerge from the Alaska Range as the source of the McKinley River. Muldrow Glacier was renamed by Alfred Hulse Brooks in 1902 in honor of U.S. Geological Survey topographer Robert Muldrow. 

In 2021, the glacier was noted to be growing in a surge that greatly exceeds the scant previous records of its status. In April that year scientists were documenting growth of the glacier at one hundred times its normal rate, advancing up to ninety feet a day during the prior few months.

See also
 List of glaciers

References

Glaciers of Denali Borough, Alaska
Glaciers of Denali National Park and Preserve
Denali
Glaciers of Alaska